Samuel Thomas may refer to:

 Buzz Thomas (Samuel Thomas, born 1969), politician from the U.S. state of Michigan
 Samuel Bath Thomas (1855–1919), founder of Thomas' English muffins and bagels
 Samuel Bell Thomas (1868–1943), New York lawyer
 Samuel Thomas (priest) (1627–1693), English nonjuring clergyman and controversialist
 Samuel Russell Thomas (1840–1903), American capitalist and Union Army general

See also
 Sam Thomas (disambiguation)